Seán Brosnan (21 December 1916 – 18 April 1979) was an Irish barrister and Fianna Fáil politician. He served for 10 years in the Oireachtas, as a Teachta Dála (TD) and as a senator.

Brosnan was a native of Dingle, County Kerry. He was a prominent Gaelic footballer and won 3 All-Ireland medals with Kerry. In 1939, he was captain of the team but could not play in the final due to influenza.

In 1933, he won an All-Ireland Minor Football Championship with Kerry. He won senior Kerry County Championship medals with Dingle GAA in 1938 and 1941. He left Dingle in the autumn of 1939.

At the 1969 general election, Brosnan was elected to the 19th Dáil as a TD for Cork North-East. It was his second attempt – he had been defeated in 1965 – and he lost his seat at the 1973 general election. He was then elected to the 13th Seanad Éireann on the Administrative Panel, but he regained his Dáil seat in a by-election in November 1974 after the death of his Fianna Fáil colleague Liam Ahern.

Brosnan was re-elected at the 1977 general election to the 21st Dáil, and also served as a Member of the European Parliament (MEP). MEPs were at that time appointed by national parliaments rather than being elected, and Brosnan was one of a 10-member delegation from the Oireachtas until the first direct elections in 1979.

After his death in 1979, the resulting by-election on 7 November was won for Fine Gael by Myra Barry.

References

 

1916 births
1979 deaths
Fianna Fáil TDs
Irish sportsperson-politicians
Members of the 19th Dáil
Members of the 13th Seanad
Members of the 20th Dáil
Members of the 21st Dáil
Politicians from County Cork
Fianna Fáil MEPs
MEPs for the Republic of Ireland 1977–1979
Irish barristers
Kerry inter-county Gaelic footballers
Fianna Fáil senators
People from Dingle